Melbourne is the capital and most populous city of Victoria, Australia.

Melbourne or Melbourn may also refer to:

Melbourne, Victoria, Australia
 Melbourne city centre, the central area of metropolitan Melbourne
 City of Melbourne, a local government area
 Electoral district of Melbourne, an electorate of the Victorian Legislative Assembly
 Division of Melbourne, an electorate of Australia's federal parliament

Other places
 Mount Melbourne, Antarctica
 Melbourne, Nova Scotia, Canada
 Melbourne, Quebec, Canada
 Melbourne, Derbyshire, UK
 Melbourne, East Riding of Yorkshire, UK
 Melbourn, Cambridgeshire, UK
 Melbourne, Arkansas, U.S.
 Melbourne, Florida, U.S.
 Melbourne, Iowa, U.S.
 Melbourne, Kentucky, U.S.

Sport
 Melbourne Football Club, a club in the Australian Football League

Music
 Melbourne (album), an album by the Models
 Melbourne (song), a song by the Whitlams

People
 Melbourne (name), a given name and a family name (including a list of people with the name)
 Peniston Lamb, 1st Viscount Melbourne (1745–1828)
 William Lamb, 2nd Viscount Melbourne (1779–1848)
 Frederick Lamb, 3rd Viscount Melbourne (1782–1853)

Ships
 Melbourne, a mid-19th-century screw steamship, which was one of three used in the mail service between England and Australia run by the Australian Royal Mail Steam Navigation Company
 HMAS Melbourne (1912), a Town-class light cruiser launched in 1912
 HMAS Melbourne (R21), a Majestic-class light aircraft carrier acquired by the RAN in 1947
 HMAS Melbourne (FFG 05), an Adelaide-class guided missile frigate launched in 1989

Other uses
 USS Melbourne, a fictional spaceship in the Star Trek: The Next Generation episode The Best of Both Worlds

See also
 Melbern, Ohio, U.S.
 Royal Melbourne (disambiguation)